Hypochthonius is a genus of mites in the family Hypochthoniidae. There are about 10 described species in Hypochthonius.

Species
These 10 species belong to the genus Hypochthonius:
 Hypochthonius elegans Hammer, 1979
 Hypochthonius lalirostris Schweizer, 1956
 Hypochthonius latirostris Schweizer, 1956
 Hypochthonius longus Ewing
 Hypochthonius luteus Oudemans, 1917
 Hypochthonius montanus Fujikawa, 2003
 Hypochthonius pallidulus
 Hypochthonius rufulus Koch, 1835
 Hypochthonius texanus Banks, 1910
 Hypochthonius ventricosus (Canestrini, 1898)

References

Further reading

External links

 

Acariformes
Articles created by Qbugbot